Ghost movies and shows can fall into a wide range of genres, including romance, comedy, horror, juvenile interest, and drama. Depictions of ghosts are as diverse as Casper the Friendly Ghost, Beetlejuice, Hamlet's father, Jacob Marley, Freddy Krueger, and Moaning Myrtle, as well as the traditional spectral spirits and other bumps in the night.

History
With the advent of motion pictures and television, screen depictions of ghosts became common and spanned a variety of genres; the works of Shakespeare, Charles Dickens and Oscar Wilde have all been made into cinematic versions.

Children's benevolent ghost stories became popular, such as Casper the Friendly Ghost, created in the 1930s and appearing in comics, animated cartoons, and eventually the 1995 feature film Casper. Noël Coward's play Blithe Spirit, later made into a film, places a more humorous slant on the phenomenon of haunting of individuals and specific locations, and The Ghost Goes West, a comedy in which a Scottish castle and its ghost are moved to Florida, was voted the best British film of 1935.

Sentimental depictions were more popular in early cinema than horror, and include the 1947 film The Ghost and Mrs. Muir, which was later adapted to television with a successful 1968–70 TV series. Genuine psychological horror films from this period include 1944's The Uninvited and 1945's Dead of Night.

The 1970s saw screen depictions of ghosts diverge into distinct genres of the romantic and horror.  A common theme in the romantic genre from this period is the ghost as a benign guide or messenger, often with unfinished business, such as 1989's Field of Dreams, the 1990 film Ghost, and the 1993 comedy Heart and Souls.  In the horror genre, 1980's The Fog, and the A Nightmare on Elm Street series of films from the 1980s and 1990s are notable examples of the trend for the merging of ghost stories with scenes of physical violence.

Popularised in such films as the 1984 comedy Ghostbusters, ghost hunting became a hobby for many who formed ghost hunting societies to explore reportedly haunted places. The ghost hunting theme has been featured in reality television series such as Ghost Adventures, Ghost Hunters, Ghost Hunters International, Most Haunted, and A Haunting. It is also represented in children's television by such programs as The Ghost Hunter and Ghost Trackers. Ghost hunting also gave rise to multiple guidebooks to haunted locations, and ghost hunting “how-to” manuals.

The 1990s saw a return to classic “gothic” ghosts, whose dangers were more psychological than physical. Examples of films from this period include 1999's The Sixth Sense and 2001's The Others.

Asian cinema has been adept at producing horror films about ghosts, such as the 1998 Japanese film Ring (remade in America as The Ring in 2002), and the Pang brothers' 2002 film The Eye.

Films

Television series

Dramas and comedies
 1953–1955: Topper
 1955–1965: Alfred Hitchcock Presents
 1959–1961: One Step Beyond
 1959–1964: The Twilight Zone
 1968–1970: The Ghost and Mrs. Muir
 1969–1971: Randall and Hopkirk (Deceased)
 1971–1978, 2005– : A Ghost Story for Christmas
 1975: The Ghost Busters
 1976–1978: The Ghosts of Motley Hall
 1976–1984: Rentaghost
 1985–1989: Alfred Hitchcock Presents
 1985–1989: The Twilight Zone
 1986–1991: The Real GhostBusters
 1987: Second Chance
 1989–1996: Tales from the Crypt
 1990: Elly & Jools
 1990–1991: Shades of L.A.
 1992–1994: So Haunt Me
 1993–1997: Zee Horror Show
 1994-2018: The X-Files
 1994–1997: The Kingdom
 1995–2015: Aahat
 1997–1998: Ghost Stories (episode list)
 1997: The Shining
 1999: Polterguests
 1999–2002: Providence
 2000: The Others
 2000–2001: Randall & Hopkirk (Deceased)
 2001: All Souls
2001–2010: Ssshhhh...Koi Hai
2001-2005: Six Feet Under (TV series)
 2002: Haunted
 2002–2003: The Twilight Zone
 2004: Kingdom Hospital
 2004–2005: Hex
 2004-2011:   Rescue Me
 2004–2011: Medium
 2005–2010: Ghost Whisperer
 2005–2020: Supernatural
 2007: The Dresden Files
 2008–2013: Being Human
 2010: Dead Gorgeous
 2011: American Horror Story: Murder House
 2011: Becoming Human
 2011: Bedlam
 2011: The Fades
 2011: Bag of Bones
 2011–2012: A Gifted Man
 2011–2014: Being Human
 2012–2017: Saving Hope
 2013–2015: The Haunted Hathaways (episodes) 
 2013–2017: Sleepy Hollow 
 2015–2016: Puli
 2015–2021: The Magicians
 2015–2016: American Horror Story: Hotel
 2016: American Horror Story: Roanoke
 2016: The Living and the Dead
 2018: The Haunting of Hill House
 2018-2020: Chilling Adventures of Sabrina
 2018–present: Wellington Paranormal
 2019–present: Ghosts (2019 TV series)
 2019: The InBetween
 2020–present: Julie and the Phantoms

Animation 
 1963–1969: The New Casper Cartoon Show
 1971–1972: The Funky Phantom
 1979: Casper and the Angels
 1985–1986: The 13 Ghosts of Scooby-Doo
 1986: Ghostbusters
 1986–1991: The Real Ghostbusters
 1989–1991: Beetlejuice
 1991–1992: Little Ghosts, There, Here, and Where
 1993–1994: Ghost Sweeper Mikami
 1996–1997: Extreme Ghostbusters
 1996–1998: The Spooktacular New Adventures of Casper
 2000–2001: Ghost stories in school
 2004–2007: Danny Phantom
 2009–2012: Casper's Scare School
 2010–2013: Scooby-Doo! Mystery Incorporated
 2012–2016: Gravity Falls
 2013: Dude, That's My Ghost!
 2015: Lego Ninjago: Masters of Spinjitzu
 2016-present: The Haunted House
 2017-2021: DuckTales
 2018-2021: Vampirina
 2021–present: The Ghost and Molly McGee

Puppets 
 1989: The Ghost of Faffner Hall

Ghost reality shows 
 1996–1997: Ghosthunters 
 1998–2001: Haunted History 
 2000–2006: Scariest Places on Earth
 2002–present: Most Haunted 
 2004–2016: Ghost Hunters
 2005–2011: Ghostly Encounters
 2005–2006: Ghost Hunt 
 2006: Extreme Ghost Stories 
 2007–2011: Paranormal State
 2008–present: Ghost Adventures
 2008–2012: Ghost Hunters International
 2009–2014: Celebrity Ghost Stories
 2009-2010: I Believe in Ghosts: Joe Swash
 2009–2010: Ghost Hunters Academy
 2009–2011: Ghost Lab
 2009–2010: Ghost Stories
 2009–2010: Most Terrifying Places in America
 2010–2013: My Ghost Story
 2011: Paranormal Challenge
 2011–present: The Dead Files
 2011–2016: Paranormal Witness
 2012: Haunted Encounters
 2005–2007; 2012–2019: A Haunting

See also 
 Ghost stories

 Indian ghost movies
 Vengeful ghost films
 A Nightmare on Elm Street
 Casper the Friendly Ghost in film
 Poltergeist
 List of ghosts

References

Sources
 Newman, Kim, ed, BFI Companion to Horror, Cassell: London, 1996.

 
 
Lists of films by common content
Lists of films by topic
Lists of horror films
Fictional ghosts
Thrillers